Sydney Francis Wise  is a Canadian historian who became the official historian of the Canadian military in 1966.

Career

He joined the Royal Canadian Air Force in 1942 and became a pilot. He enrolled in the Royal Military College of Canada. After graduating he became a professor there, Queens College and Carleton University. In 1966, he was called upon and accepted the position of the official historian of the Canadian military. In 1989 he received the Order of Canada.

Operation Spring scandal
The destruction of the Canada's Black Watch unit during the Operation Spring of the Normandy invasion was seen as a scandal and there were rumours of a Canadian coverup. These rumours were made worse by Stacy and Sydney F. Wise conspired to "keep the only surviving copy of the preliminary report on Operation Spring from Major Grifffin’s relatives." The two had actually saved the surviving copy of the report against orders.

Written work
 - Total pages: 139 
 - Total pages: 450 
 - Total pages: 771 

 - Total pages: 458 
 - Total pages: 287  
 - Total pages: 1096

Bibliography
Notes

References  

 

Canadian male non-fiction writers
Historians of Canada
Historians of World War I
Canadian university and college chancellors
Royal Canadian Air Force personnel of World War II
Queen's University at Kingston alumni
Journalists from Toronto
Writers from Toronto
1924 births
2007 deaths
Canadian magazine journalists
Presidents of the Canadian Historical Association
Canadian World War II pilots